These are the late night schedules for the four United States broadcast networks that offer programming during this time period, from September 2004 to August 2005. All times are Eastern or Pacific. Affiliates will fill non-network schedule with local, syndicated, or paid programming. Affiliates also have the option to preempt or delay network programming at their discretion.

Legend

Schedule

Monday-Friday

Note: The Late Late Show featured guest hosts between Kilborn's last episode on August 27, 2004 and Ferguson's first episode as the permanent host on January 3, 2005.

Saturday

By network

ABC

Returning series
ABC World News Now
ABC World News This Morning
Jimmy Kimmel Live!
Nightline

CBS

Returning series
CBS Morning News
Late Show with David Letterman
Up to the Minute

New series
The Late Late Show
The Late Late Show with Craig Ferguson

Not returning from 2003-04:
The Late Late Show with Craig Kilborn

Fox

Returning series
MADtv

NBC

Returning series
Early Today
Last Call with Carson Daly
Late Night with Conan O'Brien
Saturday Night Live
The Tonight Show with Jay Leno

References
TV Listings - New York Times http://tvlistings.zap2it.com/tvlistings/ZCGrid.do?fromTimeInMillis=1244797200000

United States late night network television schedules
2004 in American television
2005 in American television